S. K. Venkatranga Iyengar (1900–1989) was an Indian lawyer. He lived in Gandhinagar, Bangalore.

Life
Venkatranga Iyengar obtained his B.A. from the University of Mysore, and a law degree from the University of Mumbai. He was selected for the Indian Civil Service, however failed to attend a required interview in the UK.  Venkataranga was offered an administrative post in the state of Baroda. Venkataranga declined the offer, opting instead for a career practicing law in the Mysore High Court.  This position allowed Venkatranga to remain legally in Bangalore.

Venkatranga Iyengar was associated with the Indian Independence movement and chauffeured Gandhi in his visit to Karnataka cities.

Career
Venkatranga declined elevation to judgeship in Mysore High Court and subsequently took up constitutional matters in the Supreme Court of India. He fought many "writ of mandamus" cases to get justice for public servants and admission to students who were denied their rights due to reservation policy after independence. He was a member of the Constituent assembly for Mysore state.

He was a member of the Bangalore city corporation with his uncle and grandfather. He was responsible for getting the Hebbar Srivaishnava Sabha their premises in Gandhinagar in the early 1930s.

He fought to resolve the disputes in the Melkote shrine between Thenkalai and Vadakalai priests and was a devout worshipper at Biligirirangaswamy Temple in Biligirirangan Hills and Venugopala Krishna in Malleswaram temple.

See also
Hebbar Iyengar

References

External links
 Indian Supreme Court case- The University of Mysore & ANR V. C. D. Govinda Rao & ANR 1963 RD-SC 177 (26 August 1963)
 Indian Supreme Court case- Divisional Personnel Officer, Souther Railway V. S. Raghavendrachar 1965 RD-SC 301 (16 December 1965)
 Indian Supreme Court case- K. D. Kamath & CO V. C.I.T., Bangalore 1971 RD-SC 280 (11 October 1971)
 The Hindu news story- Inauguration of Sri S.K. Venkataranga Iyengar Trust

Scholars from Mysore
1900 births
1989 deaths
University of Mysore alumni
University of Mumbai alumni
20th-century Indian lawyers